Manuel Fumic (born 30 March 1982) is a German cross-country cyclist. He finished 8th at the 2004 Summer Olympics and 11th at the 2008 Olympic Games.  At the 2012 Summer Olympics, he competed in the men's cross-country at Hadleigh Farm, finishing in 7th place. At the 2016 Summer Olympics, he finished in 13th place.

He was on the start list for the 2018 cross-country European Championship but was not able to finish. He is the younger brother of Lado Fumic.

Major results

2001
 1st  National Under-23 XCO Championships
2002
 1st  National Under-23 XCO Championships
2003
 1st  National Under-23 XCO Championships
 2nd  UCI Under-23 World XCO Championships
 3rd  European Under-23 XCO Championships
2004
 1st  UCI Under-23 World XCO Championships
 1st  European Under-23 XCO Championships
 1st  National Under-23 XCO Championships
2008
 1st  National XCO Championships
2010
 2nd  Mixed relay, UCI World Championships
2012
 1st  National XCO Championships
 3rd  Mixed relay, UCI World Championships
2013
 2nd  UCI World XCO Championships
 3rd  Mixed relay, UCI World Championships
2014
 4th Overall UCI XCO World Cup
2015
 European Championships
1st  Mixed relay
3rd  XCO
 1st  National XCO Championships
2017
 1st  National XCO Championships
 3rd  European XCO Championships
2018
 1st  National XCO Championships
 2nd  Mixed relay, UCI World Championships
2019
 2nd Overall Cape Epic (with Henrique Avancini)
2021
 1st  National XCO Championships

References

External links

German male cyclists
Cross-country mountain bikers
1982 births
Living people
Olympic cyclists of Germany
Cyclists at the 2004 Summer Olympics
Cyclists at the 2008 Summer Olympics
Cyclists at the 2012 Summer Olympics
Cyclists at the 2016 Summer Olympics
People from Kirchheim unter Teck
Sportspeople from Stuttgart (region)
Cyclists from Baden-Württemberg
Cape Epic cyclists
German mountain bikers
Cyclists at the 2020 Summer Olympics
German people of Croatian descent